The 1984–85 New York Islanders season was the 13th season for the franchise in the National Hockey League.

Offseason

NHL Draft

Regular season

Season Standings

Schedule and results

Playoffs

Round 1 (3) New York Islanders vs (2) Washington Capitals

New York Wins Series 3-2

Round 2 (3) New York Islanders vs (1) Philadelphia Flyers

Philadelphia Wins Series 4-1

Player statistics

Note: Pos = Position; GP = Games played; G = Goals; A = Assists; Pts = Points; +/- = plus/minus; PIM = Penalty minutes; PPG = Power-play goals; SHG = Short-handed goals; GWG = Game-winning goals
      MIN = Minutes played; W = Wins; L = Losses; T = Ties; GA = Goals-against; GAA = Goals-against average; SO = Shutouts;

References

 Islanders on Hockey Database

New York Islanders seasons
New York Islanders
New York Islanders
New York Islanders
New York Islanders